The Lent Bumps 2012 was a series of rowing races at Cambridge University from Tuesday 28 February 2012 to Saturday 3 March 2012. The event was run as a bumps race and was the 125th set of races in the series of Lent Bumps which have been held annually in late February or early March since 1887. See Lent Bumps for the format of the races. 121 crews took part (69 men's crews and 52 women's crews), with nearly 1100 participants in total.

Head of the River crews
  men rowed over every day, retaining the headship they gained with blades in 2011.

  women rowed over every day also retaining the headship they won the previous year.

Highest 2nd VIIIs

On the first day, Lady Margaret caught Emmanuel quickly but were bumped back on the second day after catching a crab. They regained the place on the third day however, and proceeded to row over on the fourth to obtain the title.

Links to races in other years

Bumps Charts

Below are the bumps charts for all 4 men's and all 3 women's divisions, with the men's event on the left and women's event on the right. The bumps chart shows the progress of every crew over all four days of the racing. To follow the progress of any particular crew, find the crew's name on the left side of the chart and follow the line to the end-of-the-week finishing position on the right of the chart.

This chart may not be displayed correctly if you are using a large font size on your browser. A simple way to check is to see that the first horizontal bold line, marking the boundary between divisions, lies between positions 17 and 18. 

The combined Hughes Hall/Lucy Cavendish women's crews are listed as Lucy Cavendish only.

The Getting-on Race

The Getting-on Race allows a number of crews which did not already have a place from last year's races to compete for the right to race this year.

The 2012 Lent Bumps Getting-on Race took place on 24 February 2012.

Competing crews

Men

27 men's crews raced for 14 available spaces at the bottom of the 4th division.  The following were successful and rowed in the bumps.

The following were unsuccessful.

Women

27 women's crews raced for 15 available spaces at the bottom of the 3rd division.  The following were successful and rowed in the bumps.

The following were unsuccessful.

The following did not race

References
 Bumps results: Lent Bumps 2012 Men's Division - Cambridge University Combined Boat Clubs (CUCBC)
 Bump Results: Lent Bumps 2012 Women's Division - Cambridge University Combined Boat Clubs (CUCBC)

2012 in rowing
Lent Bumps results
2012 in English sport
Lent Bumps
Lent Bumps